Split Second is an American game show that was created by Monty Hall and Stefan Hatos and produced by their production company, Stefan Hatos-Monty Hall Productions.

There were two editions of Split Second produced by Hatos and Hall. The first was a daytime series produced for ABC that premiered on March 20, 1972, and ran until June 27, 1975, and was recorded at ABC Television Center in Hollywood. Tom Kennedy was the host for the original ABC version, with Jack Clark serving as announcer.

The second version was produced for syndication in Hamilton, Ontario, Canada, at CHCH-TV's studios; this series premiered December 15, 1986, and was a co-production of Hatos-Hall and distributors Concept Equity Funding Limited and Viacom Enterprises. Canadian television stations CHCH-TV, CFAC-TV, and CITV-TV assisted in production of the syndicated series as well, but were not credited on American airings.  The revival series featured Monty Hall as host with Sandy Hoyt as announcer and aired until the end of the 1986–87 season with reruns airing until September 11, 1987.

In February 2023, it was announced that the show would be revived by Game Show Network, with John Michael Higgins as host, and will premiere in April 2023.

Game play

Rounds 1 & 2
On each version three contestants, one a returning champion (or designate), competed.

Each question Kennedy or Hall asked had three possible correct answers. Some questions took a form such as "Name the three films for which Katharine Hepburn won the Oscar for Best Actress." For most questions, three words, names, or phrases were displayed on a board which acted as clues, and the question took a form such as "Pick a word from the board and give its plural." Approximately once each day on the ABC version there was also a "Memory Buster", in which Kennedy gave a list of items and asked which three of them were common to each other.

Contestants rang in by pushing a button on their podiums. The first person to ring in was permitted to provide any one of the three answers. The second-fastest provided one of the remaining answers, and finally the slowest player got whatever was left, by default. In the '70s version, the clues on the board were revealed first and contestants could buzz-in before the question was completed, whereas in the syndicated version the answers were revealed after the question was finished, and if a contestant rang in too soon (before the choices were revealed), he or she was forced to take a turn after the other two had their chances.

Bob Synes, producer of the 1970s Split Second, took a very strict stand regarding contestants' answers; he required contestants to guess the answers exactly right, meaning mispronounced answers were ruled incorrect, similar to most other quiz shows like Jeopardy!.  When Hall took the reins of the 1980s version he acted as judge himself, giving the player credit for the correct answer even if he/she mispronounced the answer or was close enough to the right answer.

Each player received money for a correct answer. The value of each answer was determined by the number of people supplying a correct response, and no money was deducted for answering incorrectly.

For example, if two players gave a correct answer in round one of the ABC version, each player received $10.

During the latter half of the ABC version, the first person to be the only contestant to respond correctly on a question during the first two rounds, a situation which Kennedy referred to as a "Singleton," also won a bonus prize, his or hers to keep regardless of the game's outcome.

Countdown Round
The Countdown Round served as the final round and determined the winner. No money was awarded for correct answers in this round. Instead, a correct answer enabled a player to keep control of the question and answer any parts that were still available. An incorrect answer passed control to the next player who had buzzed in.

Each player was required to give a set number of answers in order to win the game. The leader entering the Countdown Round had the lowest number, with the second place player needing one more answer than the leader and the third place player two. In the event of a tie, the tied players had to give the same number of answers. On the original series, the leader needed three answers to win (which could be accomplished in one question), the second-place player four, and the third place-player five. These numbers all increased by one when the syndicated series debuted, with four being the lowest number and six the highest.

The first player to count down to zero won the game regardless of their total score and moved on to the bonus round. All three players kept their accumulated money.

Bonus Round

1970s
Every new champion was given a choice of five car keys, which corresponded with five cars that were displayed on stage. The champion chose a car to attempt to start with the key, and if he/she was successful the car was won and the champion retired. If the car did not start, it was taken out of play and the champion tried the same key in another car if he/she returned the next day. If after four consecutive tries the key did not start a car, if the champion won the next game he/she received a choice of any of the cars on stage.

In addition to the car, a retiring champion received a cash bonus. The bonus started at $1,000 and increased by $500 for each unsuccessful bonus round (originally $200 to start with $200 more for each unsuccessful bonus round), resetting only when a champion won a car.

1980s
The bonus round on the 1980s Split Second utilized five screens which champions picked from to try to win the car.

Initially, a champion tried to determine which of the screens hid the word "CAR" behind it. If the champion picked the correct screen on the first try, he/she won the car and retired. If not, the champion won $1,000 in cash and the screen was blacked out if the champion won the next game. The process repeated until the champion chose the right screen, was defeated, or won five consecutive games, at which point he/she automatically won the car.

The bonus round was reworked later in the run and the object of the round changed. The car and another merchandise prize were available for the champion, who once again tried to pick out the car. This time, instead of being behind one screen, the word "CAR" was behind three and if the champion could correctly select those three screens, he/she won the car and retired as champion. The champion's choices were revealed one at a time and if one of the screens concealed the other prize, the round immediately ended and the correct combination of screens was shown. The champion was then presented with a decision. Hall offered him/her the prize and $1,000 cash to retire as champion or continue playing. The cash offer increased to $2,000 for a second unsuccessful attempt and then to $3,000 for a third.

If the champion reached the bonus round four days in a row and still had yet to win, the odds were increased in his/her favor by adding an additional "CAR" screen. After that, if the champion still managed to select the one screen with the other prize, Hall made a final offer of the prize and $4,000 to the champion, who would win the car automatically with a fifth match victory.

Broadcast history

ABC: 1972–1975

Split Second occupied only one timeslot during its three-year run, 12:30 PM (11:30 AM, Central), against the traditional CBS favorite Search for Tomorrow and NBC's The Who, What, or Where Game. It displaced Password, which moved ahead a half-hour. Although never able to surmount Search, Split Second kept a large number of affiliates on the network at that hour (preemptions, mostly for local newscasts, had plagued ABC for years). Within two years, NBC replaced 3W's with a succession of short-lived games.

Split Seconds 1972 entry completed ABC's most successful block of daytime game shows, which included Password, The Newlywed Game, The Dating Game, and Let's Make a Deal, a lineup which lasted for nearly two years.

However, the decline of its lead-in, Password, began to adversely affect the Nielsens of Split Second, and it was one of four game shows ABC cancelled between June 27 and July 4, 1975. After a week of 60-minute episodes of the soap opera All My Children, Split Second was succeeded by another soap, Ryan's Hope. All My Children did return to a full hour from late April 1977, continuing for the rest of its ABC run.

The winning contestant on the final episode lost the bonus game but was awarded the car anyway, since he would have no opportunity to try again on a future show; the final $1,000 cash jackpot was split between the two runner-up contestants.

Syndication: 1986–1987
In early 1986, Monty Hall had expressed his intentions to retire from hosting game shows altogether. He had been hosting a revival of Let’s Make a Deal in syndication since 1984, and he planned on stepping down from the series and launching a daily human interest program distributed by Worldvision Enterprises called For the People, where Hall would use connections he had made over various philanthropic ventures over the course of his life to offer assistance to viewers. The idea was for Hall to hand Let’s Make a Deal over to another host (likely the show’s announcer Dean Goss, as Hall allowed him to preside over several deals during the year) and start For the People in the fall. Both programs were presented in January 1986 at the annual NATPE convention. However, not enough stations showed interest in either Hall’s creation or a third season of Let’s Make a Deal. Hall and Hatos decided to revive their other hit from the 1970s and developed a new edition of Split Second, this time with Hall hosting, for a midseason premiere in December 1986.

The show aired simultaneously in the United States and Canada upon its premiere, but many more Canadian markets cleared Split Second than their American counterparts (although it was cleared in at least one major market, New York). With the reappearance of episodes on Canada's GameTV, there have emerged some notable production differences for episodes aired in Canada. These are listed as follows:

As the show returns from its first two commercial breaks, some trivia questions are displayed on the screen for the viewers. On the American airings, three questions were shown. The Canadian airings usually only displayed one question, with announcer Sandy Hoyt filling the time with fee plugs.
On the American airings, the bonus round is played immediately as the show comes back from its final commercial break. On the Canadian airings, a series of promotional consideration plugs are read before the round begins.
In the closing credits, Canadian airings credit Hatos-Hall, Concept Equity Funding Limited, the Canadian stations involved in the production of the series, and distributor Viacom (now part of CBS Media Ventures). The Canadian entities do not receive credit on American airings; only Hatos-Hall and Viacom receive billing.

Episode status
The UCLA Film and Television Archive holds 15 episodes spanning the entire run, beginning at episode #39 (May 11, 1972) and ending with the finale.

The syndicated version is completely intact, and is currently owned by Fremantle (which like Let's Make A Deal & It's Anybody's Guess, used to be owned by Hatos-Hall Productions) and reran on The Family Channel from August 30, 1993, to March 4, 1994, and January 2 to September 29, 1995, as part of its afternoon game show block. As of July 2019, GameTV  is airing reruns. The music package for this version was added to the Television Production Music Museum in 2017, joining the 1972 package.

The 1986 series returned to American television in September 2019 when Buzzr, a digital television network owned by Fremantle, began airing it weekday mornings.

International versions

Australia
The show ran in Australia from 1972 to 1973 on Nine Network, hosted by Ken James and later by Jimmy Hannan, and produced by Reg Grundy.

United Kingdom
The show ran in the United Kingdom from 1987 to 1988 in the STV region of ITV, hosted by Paul Coia.

References

External links
 Split Second @ Tim's TV Showcase
 Original Split Second at Game Show Utopia
 Original Split Second at Game Shows '75
 
 

1970s American game shows
1972 American television series debuts
1975 American television series endings
1980s American game shows
1980s Canadian game shows
1986 American television series debuts
1986 Canadian television series debuts
1987 American television series endings
1987 Canadian television series endings

American Broadcasting Company original programming
American television series revived after cancellation
English-language television shows
First-run syndicated television programs in the United States

Television series by Stefan Hatos-Monty Hall Productions
Television shows filmed in Hamilton, Ontario
Television shows filmed in Toronto